The Baldwin-Whitehall School District is a large, suburban, public school district which serves the boroughs of Baldwin and Whitehall and Baldwin Township in Pennsylvania. According to 2000 federal census data, it served a resident population of 36,687 people. By 2010, the district's population declined to 35,731 people. In 2009, Baldwin-Whitehall School District residents' per capita income was $21,872 a year, while the median family income was $53,196. In the Commonwealth, the median family income was $49,501  and the United States median family income was $49,445, in 2010.

Extracurriculars
The district offers a variety of clubs, activities, and sports.

Sports
The district funds:

Boys
Baseball - AAAA
Basketball- AAAA
Bowling - AAAA
Cross Country - AA
Football - AAAA
Golf - AAA
Indoor Track and Field - AAAA
Lacrosse - AAAA
Soccer - AAA
Swimming and Diving - AAA
Tennis - AAA
Track and Field - AAA
Volleyball - AAA
Water Polo - AAAA
Wrestling - AAA

Girls
Basketball - AAAA
Bowling - AAAA
Cheer - AAA
Cross Country - AAA
Gymnastics - AAAA
Indoor Track and Field - AAAA
Lacrosse - AAAA
Soccer (Fall) - AAA
Softball - AAAA
Swimming and Diving - AAA
Girls' Tennis - AAA
Track and Field - AAA
Volleyball - AAA
Water Polo - AAAA

Harrison Middle School Sports

Boys
Baseball
Basketball
Cross Country
Football
Soccer
Swimming and Diving
Track and Field
Volleyball
Wrestling	

Girls
Basketball
Cross Country
Soccer (Fall)
Softball
Swimming and Diving
Track and Field
Volleyball

According to PIAA directory July 2012

Notes 

School districts in Allegheny County, Pennsylvania
Education in Pittsburgh area